The Salk School of Science is a renowned junior high school in Gramercy, Manhattan, New York City and is a very competitive school. For the class of 2023, the admissions rate was just above 4%. It was founded in 1995 as a unique collaboration between the New York University School of Medicine and the New York City Department of Education. The goal of the school is to encourage an enthusiasm for, and the development of abilities in, the sciences, particularly the medical and biological sciences. Science and math are specialties at the school, including special classes for it and after-school programs. A particular aim is to encourage city children to aim for better high schools and colleges.  It is located on the top two floors of the P.S. 40 building on East 20th Street between 1st and 2nd Avenues in Manhattan.

The school was named for Jonas Salk, developer of the first polio vaccine. Dr. Salk approved the use of his name by NYU before his death in 1995.

The school's nontraditional discovery-based learning methodology has been cited as resulting in improved cognitive and reasoning skills in students.

Members of the New York medical community work with the school to develop curriculum, and members of the Schools of Medicine and New York University School of Dentistry at New York University teach and mentor students in grades 6 through 8. The NYU Medical Center makes facilities available to the school, and members of the science faculty of the NYU School of Medicine review school students at certain points in their school career, notably at admission and graduation.

Although the school is dubbed as a "Science School", the middle school spends an equal amount of time on Humanities (Reading, Writing and Social Studies), as well as Math. Other notable classes include Spanish, Art, Physical Education, Technology, Health and Drama.

The principal of the school is Rhonda Perry and the vice/assistant principal is Jennifer Goodwin.

The school allows students to bring money to school and at lunch time, to go out and buy themselves lunch at a variety of delis and restaurants. The school shares its building with another school, P.S. 40 which owns most of the building. There is a gymnasium, a cafeteria which is shared between the schools, and 2 floors exclusive to Salk School of Science. Both are located near the top of the building. There are 3 entrances one to the left side of the building, one to the right and one in the center. Students will normally exit through the right hand exit. There is school bus service which will bring students to and from school, thought most students take public transportation.

See also

 Education in New York City
 New York City Department of Education

Notes

External links
Salk School of Science

Public middle schools in Manhattan
Gramercy Park